The 1903–04 British Home Championship football tournament was a low-scoring affair, won by a powerful England side who were followed by the unfancied Irish in second place. The tournament was played during the second half of the British domestic season and was, for the time, low-scoring.

England began well, with a hard-fought draw with Wales and a 3–1 victory over Ireland in their opening games. Scotland were unable to match this success, only managing draws against both sides. The Irish recovered from their early loss in their draw with Scotland and managed to beat the Welsh 1–0 in Bangor to claim second place. In the final game, England and Scotland played out a close encounter which England won 1–0 thanks to a goal by Steve Bloomer.

This was the first time in tournament history that either England or Scotland finished below second place.

Table

Results

Winning squad

References

1904 in British sport
Brit
Brit
1903
Brit
Brit